Kualoa Airfield is a former wartime airfield on Oahu, Hawaii. Part of it is now the Kualoa Regional Park.

See also

 Hawaii World War II Army Airfields

References

External links
 
 Kualoa Regional Park - official site

Airfields of the United States Army Air Forces in Hawaii
History of Oahu
Defunct airports in Hawaii
1942 establishments in Hawaii
1945 disestablishments in Hawaii